Asteriognatha is a genus of moths belonging to family Tortricidae.

Species
Asteriognatha cyclocentra Diakonoff, 1983
Asteriognatha metriotera Diakonoff, 1983

See also
List of Tortricidae genera

References

 , 1983, Zool. Verh. Leiden 204: 86.
 , 2005, World Catalogue of Insects 5

External links
tortricidae.com

Archipini
Tortricidae genera
Taxa named by Alexey Diakonoff